Marguerite Andersen  (October 15, 1924 – October 1, 2022) was a German-born Canadian francophone writer and educator writer, who was based in Toronto, Ontario, where she was a teacher at the Toronto Linden School.

Life and career
Andersen was born in Germany and received the Staatsexamen at the Free University of Berlin and studied at France's Sorbonne. She came to Canada in 1958 after living in various countries such as England, Ethiopia, Tunisia and the United States. Her Ph.D. in French Studies is from the Université de Montréal.

Andersen also taught at Concordia University, Mount St. Vincent University and the University of Guelph.

In 1996, Andersen produced a play at Factory Theatre in Toronto called Stations in a Painter's Life about German-born Canadian artist Christiane Pflug, based on the life of the artist until her suicide in 1972.

From 1998, she was editor for the quarterly French literary journal Virages .

Andersen won the 2009 French-language Trillium Award, category "Prix de poésie Trillium" for her book Le figuier sur le toit and 2014 in the category "Prix du livre d'enfant Trillium" for La mauvaise mère.

In December 2016, Andersen was named a Member of the Order of Canada.

Andersen died on October 1, 2022, at the age of 97.

Selected works
 1965: Paul Claudel et l'Allemagne (Presses de l'Université d'Ottawa)
 1972: Mother was not a person (Content Publishing/Blank Rose Books)
 1975: Paroles Rebelles  (reissued 1992; with Christine Klein-Lataud; Éditions du Remue-ménage)
 1982: De mémoire de femme  (Quinze)
 1984: L'Autrement pareille  (Prise de Parole)
 1991: Courts Métrages et Instantanés  (Prise de Parole)
 1992: L'Homme-papier  (Editions du Remue-ménage)
 1993: La chambre noire du bonheur  (Hurtubuise HMH)
 1994: Conversations dans l'Interzone  (Prise de Parole)
 1995: La Soupe ,  (won 1996 Grand Prix du Salon du livre de Toronto; Triptyque)
 1997: La Bicyclette ,  (Centre FORA)
 1998: Le Crus de l'Esplanade  (Prise de Parole)
 2000: Bleu sur Blanc  (Prise de Parole)
 2003: Dreaming our Space  (Guernica)
 2004: Parallèles  (Prise de Parole)
 2006: Doucement le bonheur  (Gently happiness)   (Prise de Parole); about the events surrounding the 1929-30 trials of MP Louis-Mathias Auger for rape, and a fictionalized account of the protagonists later lives
 2009: Le figuier sur le toit  (Les Éditions l'Interligne)
 2011: La vie devant elles  (Prise de Parole)
 2013: La mauvaise mère   (Prise de Parole)

Theatre
 1996: Christiane : Stations in a Painter's Life*, Festival The Gathering, Factory Theatre, Toronto, 1996.
 1996–97: La Fête, Prix O'Neill-Karsh, mises en lecture Théâtre La Catapulte, Ottawa, 1997 et Théâtre du Nouvel-Ontario, Sudbury, 1996.

See also

Canadian literature
Canadian poetry
List of Canadian poets
List of Canadian writers

References

External links

  L'Île: Marguerite Andersen biography
 Writers' Union of Canada: Marguerite Andersen profile
 Archives of Marguerite Andersen (Marguerite Andersen fonds, R12515) are held at Library and Archives Canada
 

1924 births
2022 deaths
University of Paris alumni
Canadian educators
20th-century Canadian poets
21st-century Canadian poets
Canadian women poets
Franco-Ontarian people
Writers from Toronto
German emigrants to Canada
Canadian poets in French
Canadian writers in French
Université de Montréal alumni
Academic staff of Concordia University
20th-century German women writers
20th-century German writers
21st-century Canadian women writers
Members of the Order of Canada
German expatriates in France
German expatriates in the United Kingdom
German expatriates in Tunisia
German expatriates in Ethiopia
German expatriates in the United States